Neal McDonough (born February 13, 1966) is an American actor. He is known for his portrayal of Lieutenant Lynn "Buck" Compton in the HBO miniseries Band of Brothers (2001), Deputy District Attorney David McNorris on Boomtown (2002–2003), Tin Man in the Sci Fi Channel miniseries Tin Man, and a main cast role as Dave Williams in Season 5 of Desperate Housewives (2008–2009). He has also appeared in films such as Star Trek: First Contact, Minority Report, Walking Tall, and as Dum Dum Dugan in various Marvel Cinematic Universe films and TV series. In the DC Arrowverse, he has appeared as Damien Darhk in the TV series Arrow, Legends of Tomorrow, and The Flash. He had a major role in Suits for several seasons (2014–2019) and played Malcolm Beck on Yellowstone (2019).

Early life and education
McDonough was born in Dorchester, Massachusetts, on February 13, 1966, the son of Catherine (née Bushe) and Frank McDonough, motel owners who emigrated from Ireland, with his mother coming from County Tipperary and his father from County Galway. McDonough grew up in Barnstable, Massachusetts and was raised Catholic. His childhood nickname was "Headster", which McDonough says originated in his brothers' teasing him about the size of his head. He graduated from Barnstable High School, and attended Syracuse University, where he was initiated and became a member of the Sigma Chi Fraternity and graduated with a Bachelor of Fine Arts degree in 1988.  He had obtained several college scholarships to play baseball, but decided to go to Syracuse, as he thought it had the best theater department. McDonough furthered his classical theatre training at the London Academy of Music and Dramatic Art.

Career

In 1991, McDonough won the Best Actor Dramalogue for "Away Alone". McDonough has made many television and film appearances since then, including Band of Brothers, Boomtown, Star Trek: First Contact, Minority Report and The Hitcher. McDonough played Dave Williams on the fifth season of Desperate Housewives. He also starred in the lead role on 2004 medical drama Medical Investigation for its one full season.

In 1996, McDonough voiced Bruce Banner in the animated television seriesThe Incredible Hulk which ran for two seasons. McDonough reprised his role in the 2005 video game, The Incredible Hulk: Ultimate Destruction.

McDonough was set to star in the ABC dramedy Scoundrels, but was fired for refusing to act in sex scenes, citing his family and Catholic faith as basis for his decision.

McDonough portrays Jesus in "The Truth & Life Dramatized Audio New Testament Bible," a 22-hour, celebrity-voiced, fully dramatized audio New Testament which uses the Catholic edition of the revised standard version of the Bible.

In 2011, McDonough appeared as Dum Dum Dugan in Captain America: The First Avenger. McDonough also voiced the character in the 2011 movie tie-in video game, Captain America: Super Soldier. He reprised his role four times since then: in the 2013 short film, Agent Carter; in the first episode of the second season of Agents of S.H.I.E.L.D. (2014); in an episode of the Agent Carter television series (2015); and as an alternate version in an episode of the What If...? television series (2021).

In 2012, McDonough had a recurring role in the third season of FX's Justified as Robert Quarles, a sadistic carpetbagging mobster from Detroit. He was later cast as Police Chief Parker in Frank Darabont's TNT pilot Mob City.

During the 2014 Winter Olympics opening ceremony on NBC, McDonough was featured in a high-profile and frequently aired Poolside commercial for the Cadillac ELR hybrid electric car.

In 2015, McDonough was cast as DC Comics villain Damien Darhk on the fourth season of Arrow.

In 2021, he was cast as President Dwight D. Eisenhower on the tenth season of American Horror Story, titled Double Feature. He is a main cast member for the second part of the season.  The same year, he also portrayed the character Dr. William Birkin, the lead villain of the popular video game Resident Evil 2, in a live-action film adaptation of the first two Resident Evil games, entitled Resident Evil: Welcome to Raccoon City.

In 2022, McDonough was a guest artist and narrator for the 2022 annual Tabernacle Choir Christmas Program.

Throughout his career McDonough has enjoyed recognition for his various character roles in both film and television, as well as for his voice work in animation and video games. As a result of these accolades, he is especially considered one of the best "bad guy character actors" in the industry today

Personal life
McDonough is a devout Catholic. In 2003, McDonough married Ruvé Robertson, a South African model whom McDonough met in the United Kingdom while filming Band of Brothers. The couple have five children, Morgan "Little Buck" Patrick (born November 28, 2005), Catherine Maggie (born May 14, 2007), London Jane (born January 11, 2010), Clover Elizabeth (born August 15, 2011), and James Hamilton (born March 31, 2014). He has stated that he refuses to perform sex or kissing scenes because of his faith and respect for his wife. He said he was fired from the TV series Scoundrels for his refusal to perform sex scenes. McDonough and his family resided in the seaside community of Tsawwassen, British Columbia, but have since relocated back to Los Angeles.

Filmography

Film

Television

Video games

Internet

Awards and nominations

References

External links

 
 
 

1966 births
Male actors from Boston
American male film actors
American male television actors
American male voice actors
American people of Irish descent
Barnstable High School alumni
Living people
Syracuse University alumni
People from Dorchester, Massachusetts
Catholics from Massachusetts